John Groninga (born May 5, 1945) is an American politician who served in the Iowa House of Representatives from the 20th district from 1983 to 1993.

References

1945 births
Living people
Democratic Party members of the Iowa House of Representatives
Politicians from Hackensack, New Jersey